is a passenger railway station located in the city of Kasai, Hyōgo Prefecture, Japan, operated by the third-sector Hōjō Railway Company.

Lines
Hokkeguchi Station is served by the Hōjō Line and is 6.1 kilometers from the terminus of the line at Ao Station.

Station layout
The station consists of two opposed side platforms connected by a level crossing. The station is unattended.

Adjacent stations

History
Hokkeguchi Station opened on March 3, 1915. The station building and platform were registered by the national government as a National Registered Tangible Cultural Property in 2014.The outhouse toilet of the station also received protection as a  Registered Tangible Cultural Property at the same time.

Passenger statistics
In fiscal 2018, the station was used by an average of 78 passengers daily.

Surrounding area
 Ichijo-ji Temple (Saigoku Kannon Pilgrimage Temple No. 26)
 Center for Food Resources Education and Research, Graduate School of Agriculture, Kobe University

See also
List of railway stations in Japan

References

External links
 
  

Railway stations in Hyōgo Prefecture
Railway stations in Japan opened in 1915
Kasai, Hyōgo
Registered Tangible Cultural Properties